Lanzano is an Italian surname. Notable people with the surname include:

Agostino da Lanzano (died 1410), Roman Catholic bishop
Andrea Lanzano (1651–1709), Italian Baroque painter
Mattia Lanzano (born 1990), Italian footballer

Italian-language surnames